Burkhard Segler (born 5 March 1951 in Oberhausen) is a retired German footballer who made a total of 88 appearances in the Fußball-Bundesliga during his playing career.

Segler played one game for the Germany national football B team on 22 February 1977 in Orléans, France, where they lost 1–0.

References 
 

1951 births
Living people
Sportspeople from Oberhausen
German footballers
Association football midfielders
Germany B international footballers
Bundesliga players
2. Bundesliga players
Bayer 04 Leverkusen players
VfL Osnabrück players
FC Bayern Munich footballers
Borussia Dortmund players
FC Viktoria Köln players
Rot-Weiß Oberhausen players
1. FC Bocholt players
Footballers from North Rhine-Westphalia
West German footballers